Vjekoslav Župančić (18 May 1900 – 14 February 1971) was a Yugoslav footballer. He was born and died in Zagreb.

International career
He competed for the Kingdom of Serbs, Croats and Slovenes at the 1920 Summer Olympics, earning his only cap in a game against Czechosllovakia.

References

External links
 
 Vjekoslav Župančić at reprezentacija.rs
 Vjekoslav Župančić at Sports-Reference.com

1900 births
1971 deaths
Burials at Mirogoj Cemetery
Footballers from Zagreb
People from the Kingdom of Croatia-Slavonia
Association football defenders
Yugoslav footballers
Yugoslavia international footballers
Olympic footballers of Yugoslavia
Footballers at the 1920 Summer Olympics
HAŠK players
FK Austria Wien players
Yugoslav expatriate footballers
Expatriate footballers in Austria
Yugoslav expatriate sportspeople in Austria